John Bennett Cowley (3 February 1877 – 21 December 1926) was an English footballer who made 68 appearances in the Football League playing for Lincoln City. He played at left half. He also played in the Southern League for Swindon Town.

References

1877 births
1926 deaths
Sportspeople from Burton upon Trent
English footballers
Association football wing halves
Hinckley Town F.C. players
Lincoln City F.C. players
Swindon Town F.C. players
English Football League players
Southern Football League players
Place of death missing